Ganley is a surname. Notable people with the surname include:

 Allan Ganley (1931–2008), English jazz drummer
 Bernard Ganley (1927–2009), English rugby league player
 Bob Ganley (1875–1945), American baseball player
 Caroline Ganley (1879–1966), English Labour Party politician
 Declan Ganley (b. 1968), British-born Irish entrepreneur
 Howden Ganley (b. 1941), former New Zealand racing driver
 Len Ganley (1943–2011), retired Northern Irish snooker referee
 David Ganley (1957-present), world renowned wood carver; artist